Lohrbach is a small river in the municipality of Flörsbachtal in the Main-Kinzig district of Hesse, Germany.

Course
The stream originates in the village of Lohrhaupten ("head of the Lohr") at the Lohrquelle. It then flows southwest and then south until it joins the Flörsbach to form the Lohr southeast of Kempfenbrunn.

See also
List of rivers of Hesse
Spessart

References

External links

Rivers of Hesse
Rivers of the Spessart
Rivers of Germany